The Western Division was a division in the National Basketball Association (NBA) and its forerunner, the Basketball Association of America (BAA). The division was created at the start of the 1946–47 BAA season, when the league was created, and was then kept as one of the divisions when BAA merged with the National Basketball League (NBL) to create the NBA on August 3, 1949. The division existed until the 1970–71 NBA season when the NBA expanded from 14 to 17 teams and realigned into the Eastern and Western conferences with two divisions each.

Teams

Notes
 
  denotes an expansion team.
  denotes a team that merged from the National Basketball League (NBL)

Team timeline

Division champions

Titles by team

Season results

References

National Basketball Association divisions